Sarah Washbrooke is a New Zealand primary school teacher best known for winning the 2019  Technology Education New Zealand (TENZ) ‘Outstanding Technology Teacher Award’ and the 2020 Prime Minister's Science Teacher Prize.

Originally from the UK, Washbrooke completed a Industrial Design & Technology with Education degree at Loughborough University  in 1997 and now in teaches technology at Remarkables Primary School in Queenstown, New Zealand. they are involved with Technology Education New Zealand (TENZ).

Washbrooke serves as an accessor for MBIE's Unlocking Curious Minds Contestable Fund.

References 

Living people
21st-century New Zealand educators
British emigrants to New Zealand
Year of birth missing (living people)